Florin Ganea (4 April 1976 – 9 September 2015) was a Romanian professional footballer who played as a left back for teams such as FCM Bacău, Cetatea Târgu Neamț, Unirea Urziceni or Gloria Bistrița, among others.

He died tragically in 2015, at only 39 years old, when he suffered a heart attack during a five-a-side football match.

Honours
FCM Bacău
Divizia B: 1994–95
Cupa Ligii: 1998

References

1976 births
2015 deaths
Sportspeople from Bacău
Romanian footballers
Association football defenders
Liga I players
Liga II players
FCM Bacău players
CSM Roman (football) players
FC Unirea Urziceni players
ACF Gloria Bistrița players